Several municipalities in the Canadian province of Quebec held municipal elections to elect mayors and councillors on November 5, 1989. One of the most closely watched contests was in Quebec City, where Jean-Paul L'Allier of the Rassemblement populaire party ended the twenty-five year rule of the Civic Progress Party. L'Allier defeated Civic Progress candidate Jean-Francois Bertrand by a fairly significant margin.

Results (incomplete)

Verdun
Former Liberal Party of Canada Member of Parliament (MP) Raymond Savard was elected to his second term as mayor in the on-island Montreal suburb of Verdun, easily defeating opponents Jean-Marie Demers and Robert Mailhot. Most elected councillors were from Savard's Regroupement des citoyens de Verdun party.

Party colours in the results listed below have been randomly chosen and do not indicate affiliation with or resemblance to any municipal, provincial, or federal party.

Sources: "La liste des candidats," La Presse, 5 November 1989, A7; Florian Bernard, "Verdun: Savard reporté au pouvoir; Pierrefonds: Morin élu," La Presse, 6 November 1989, B5; Élus de Verdun de 1875 à 2005, City of Montreal. (The first two sources erroneously list Savard's mayoral opponent Demers as the leader of the Regroupement des citoyens de Verdun. This is contradicted by other sources, and, indeed, the second La Presse article indicates that Savard's party won a majority on council.)

References

 
1989